The J.A. Sweeton Residence was built in 1950 in Cherry Hill, in Camden County, New Jersey, United States. At , it is the smallest of the four Frank Lloyd Wright houses in New Jersey. This Usonian scheme house was constructed of concrete blocks and redwood plywood.

The Sweeton House is sheltered by a dramatically pitched roof that comes within four feet of the ground. Wright loved the automobile but thought garages were a relic of the "livery-stable mind," according to his revised autobiography.

The compact horizontal plan reflects a standard Usonian scheme. Three bedrooms and one bathroom are arranged on a linear axis like cabins of an ocean liner. With its prominent living room defined by six glass doors, mitered glass corners and cathedral ceiling, the home seems larger than its .

The Sweeton House remains a private residence and is not accessible by the public. The larger original site has been subdivided and is isolated from major roadways.

Address is actually 373 Kings Highway.  375 is Princeton Behavioral Center, house is behind the Center.

References

 Storrer, William Allin. The Frank Lloyd Wright Companion. University of Chicago Press, 2006,  (S.325)

External links
 Exploring Art - Frank Lloyd Wright - JA Sweeton Residence
 Frank Lloyd Wright Houses - Bernardsville, Cherry Hill, Glen Ridge, Millstone
 PrairieMod: One Couple "Sweeton's" Their Life Style
 J A Sweeton House photos on Flickr
 J A Sweeton House, Cherry Hill NJ 1950 - Frank Lloyd Wright Designed Buildings on Waymarking.com
 Cherry Hill Historical Commission
 "On the Trail of Frank Lloyd Wright," The New York Times, 2001

Houses completed in 1950
Cherry Hill, New Jersey
Frank Lloyd Wright buildings
Houses in Camden County, New Jersey